Martiros Saryan (– 5 May 1972) was a Soviet Armenian painter, the founder of a modern Armenian national school of painting.

Biography
He was born into an Armenian family in Nakhichevan-on-Don (now part of Rostov-on-Don, Russia). In 1895 at the age of 15, he completed the Nakhichevan school and from 1897 to 1904 studied at the Moscow School of Arts, including in the workshops of Valentin Serov and Konstantin Korovin. He was heavily influenced by the work of Paul Gauguin and Henri Matisse. He exhibited his works in various shows. He had works shown at the Blue Rose Exhibit in Moscow.

He first visited Armenia, then part of the Russian Empire, in 1901, visiting Lori, Shirak, Echmiadzin, Haghpat, Sanahin, Yerevan and Sevan. He composed his first landscapes depicting Armenia: Makravank, 1902; Aragats, 1902; Buffalo. Sevan, 1903; Evening in the Garden, 1903; In the Armenian village, 1903, etc., which were highly praised in the Moscow press.

From 1910 to 1913 he traveled extensively in Turkey, Egypt and Iran. In 1915, he went to Echmiadzin to help refugees who had fled from the Armenian genocide in the Ottoman Empire. In 1916, he traveled to Tiflis (now Tbilisi) where he married Lusik Agayan. It was there that he helped organise the Society of Armenian Artists.

Following the Bolshevik seizure of power in 1917, he went with his family to live in Russia. In 1921, they moved to Armenia. While most of his work reflected the Armenian landscape, he also designed the coat of arms for the Armenian SSR and designed the curtain for the first Armenian state theatre. He also made a proposal for the flag of this independent Armenia based on the colours and designs of traditional Armenian fabrics and carpets, although his design was rejected.

From 1926 to 1928 he lived and worked in Paris, but most works from this period were destroyed in a fire on board the boat on which he returned to the Soviet Union. From 1928 until his death, Saryan lived in Soviet Armenia.

In the difficult years of the 1930s, he mainly devoted himself again to landscape painting, as well as portraits. He also was chosen as a deputy to the USSR Supreme Soviet and was awarded the Order of Lenin three times and other awards and medals. He was a member of the USSR Art Academy (1974) and Armenian Academy of Sciences (1956).

Saryan died in Yerevan on 5 May 1972. His former home in Yerevan is now a museum dedicated to his work with hundreds of items on display. He was buried in Yerevan at the Pantheon next to Komitas Vardapet.

His son Ghazaros (Lazarus) Saryan was a composer and educator. His great-granddaughter Mariam Petrosyan is also a painter, as well as a cartoonist and award-winning novelist.

Gallery

References

External links

 Martiros Sarian House-Museum
 About Martiros Sarian House-Museum
 M. Saryan: Biography, Gallery
 M. Saryan in The Color of Armenian Land
 Saryan, Minas, Parajanov

1880 births
1972 deaths
20th-century Armenian painters
20th-century Russian painters
Armenian portrait painters
Armenian still life painters
Burials at the Komitas Pantheon
Full Members of the USSR Academy of Arts
Heroes of Socialist Labour
Orientalist painters
Artists from Rostov-on-Don
People's Artists of the USSR (visual arts)
Russian people of Armenian descent
Russian male painters
Ethnic Armenian painters
Russian portrait painters
Soviet painters
20th-century Russian male artists